Tracy Farm is an historic home and farm complex located at Orleans in Jefferson County, New York. The farmhouse was built about 1890 on an existing limestone foundation.  The main 2-story part of the house is an L-shaped block with a -story kitchen ell extending off the rear elevation. Also on the property are an original late-19th-century horse and buggy barn, cow barn, wooden silo, the original farmhouse dating to 1860, and the remains of an iron windmill and pump.

It was listed on the National Register of Historic Places in 1997.

References

Houses on the National Register of Historic Places in New York (state)
Houses completed in 1890
Houses in Jefferson County, New York
National Register of Historic Places in Jefferson County, New York